Santa Rosa Junior College (SRJC) is a public community college in Santa Rosa, California with an additional campus in Petaluma and centers in surrounding Sonoma County. Santa Rosa Junior College was modeled as a feeder school for the University of California system (a "junior" version of nearby University of California, Berkeley, with the Bear Cub mascot modeled after Oski). SRJC is operated by the Sonoma County Community College District.

History
Founded in 1918, Santa Rosa Junior College is the tenth oldest community college in the state. Over nearly a century, five presidents have served SRJC: Floyd P. Bailey (1921-1957), Randolph Newman (1957-1970), Roy Mikalson (1971-1990), Dr. Robert F. Agrella (1990-2012) and Dr. Frank Chong (2012–present).

President Newman established the Santa Rosa Junior College Foundation as a 501(c)(3) nonprofit organization in 1969. The foundation is responsible for the administration of scholarships and infrastructural development fundraising, in large part through the Alumni & Friends Association. SRJC was closed from May 7–11, 1970 after Governor Ronald Reagan ordered that all California colleges and universities shut down due to anti-war protests and rallies after the shootings of four students at Kent State University.

In 2016, President Frank Chong announced a $410 million bond-supported "major overhaul of campus facilities in order to support our future students’ learning needs," the largest such project in the college's history.

Campus

Santa Rosa campus

In addition to its administration buildings, classroom facilities, and laboratories, the campus houses a Planetarium, the Robert F. Agrella Art Gallery, Summer Repertory Theatre, and the Santa Rosa Junior College Museum.

Frank P. Doyle Library

Planning for the library began in 1993. In both the June and November 2002 elections, local residences provided funding for the construction of the building In August 2006, SRJC moved its Santa Rosa campus library to the new Frank P. Doyle Library building. It houses the Library, Media Services, Distance Education, and Instructional Computing Departments, as well as the College art gallery, tutorial center and Center for Excellence in Teaching and Learning, a multimedia training and production facility for SRJC faculty. Approximately 5,500 users per day enter the Frank P. Doyle Library.

The first floor contains the Art Gallery, Tutorial Center, Media Services, television studio, and two large technology-enhanced classrooms. The second floor contains library services: Information Commons (reference services and research area), Periodicals, Library teaching classrooms, Technical Services Department, and Inter-library Loan services. The third floor contains library study spaces and book collections, Instructional Computing Department, Distance Education, and the Center for Excellence in Teaching and Learning. The fourth floor contains library study spaces and book collections, library Course Reserve Services.

The library is a technologically advanced structure that incorporates numerous green building features designed to make it energy efficient and environmentally friendly. This includes an array of 77 KW photovoltaic solar panels on the library roof will generate a significant amount of the electricity used in the building. The air conditioning system makes 350 tons of ice at night, when energy costs are lowest, then circulates water through the ice during the day to chill it before sending it through the building. Wireless Internet access is available throughout the building. Approximately 85% of roof tile and 80% of ceiling tile contents were derived from recycled materials; Recycled materials are also used in carpets and upholstery fabrics. Green and non-toxic building materials have been selected whenever possible to reduce outgassing and the use of non-renewable petroleum-based resources; Heating and electrical systems were running well before occupancy so that as much outgassing of materials as possible happens BEFORE building occupants move in. The building's many ceiling-to-floor windows and its skylights are strategically placed to maximize the use of natural sunlight. Lights turn off automatically when users leave study rooms and offices.

Santa Rosa Junior College librarians were leaders in the early movement to promote information literacy in California's community colleges, and SRJC was among the first of the colleges to institute an information literacy requirement for graduation. The Library and Information Resources Department offers several full-credit courses which fill this requirement.

Robert F. Agrella Art Gallery
Named in 2012 in honor of the recently retired president of 22 years, the Robert F. Agrella Art Gallery  offers exhibits and programs which support the art curriculum, focusing on art history, ceramics, computer graphics, drawing, graphic design, jewelry, painting, photography, printmaking and sculpture. In addition to the Annual Student Show and the occasional Art Faculty exhibits, quality art from outside the area is shown throughout the year. Exhibits are open to the community.

The Santa Rosa Junior College Art Gallery was established in 1973, the first significant exhibition space in the region. The original gallery location was in Bussman Hall on the Santa Rosa Campus, where an old anthropology museum previously existed.

In 1998, the North Bay Bohemian named SRJC's Art Gallery the "Best Art Gallery in the North Bay."

In fall 2006, the Art Gallery transitioned to a new space in the Frank P. Doyle Library that opened in 2007 on the Santa Rosa Campus, and continues bringing quality art exhibits to Sonoma County.

The gallery is located on the first floor of the Doyle Library building on the Santa Rosa campus.

Jesse Peter Museum
The college's Jesse Peter Museum, also known as the Santa Rosa Junior College Museum, focuses on the Native American art of North America and ethnographic art of parts of Mesoamerica, Central America, South America, Africa, and Asia. Permanent exhibits include Native American baskets, jewelry and pottery that come from the Elsie Allen Collection, acquired in the 1970s. The permanent and changing art exhibits focus on Native American art and anthropology of other cultures, and are used as a resource for multi-cultural studies by Santa Rosa Junior College students and area students.

The museum is located at Bussman Hall, 1501 Mendocino Avenue, Santa Rosa, California.

Burdo Culinary Arts Center
The B. Robert Burdo Center is the new home of Santa Rosa Junior College's Culinary Arts Program. The two-story, 22,000 square foot building includes three classrooms, and four teaching kitchens, incorporating a public demonstration kitchen. The popular student-run Café and Bakery is featured on the first floor of the new building. It was completed in 2012 and put into service for the Spring 2012 semester.

Petaluma campus
SRJC began offering evening classes in Petaluma in 1964, and in the early 1970s held classes in leased spaces throughout the city. In 1985, the Board of Trustees purchased a  site in east Petaluma, and in 1995 the first phase of construction of a Petaluma Center was completed. The Petaluma Center officially became a campus in April 1999. The second phase of construction to expand the Petaluma Campus to a 12,000-student capacity was completed in 2008, and included: life science and physical science labs, an art studio, a new 35,000 square foot library, a physical fitness center, bookstore, student services areas, dining areas, additional classrooms and technology labs, faculty/administrative offices, a digital arts lab, a nearly 300-seat auditorium (Carole L. Ellis Auditorium), and expanded outdoor spaces. The contemporary adobe-style buildings with red tile roofs and clock tower with Westminster chimes reflect the Spanish history of the area.

Herold Mahoney Library
The Herold Mahoney Library at SRJC's Petaluma campus originally opened its doors in the Fall of 1995. The library boasts a solid collection of books and periodical subscriptions, networked access to the Santa Rosa campus and to worldwide electronic information resources, and a very active library instruction and information literacy program. Many of the programs in SRJC's Arts & Lectures Series take place in the Mahoney Library.
With the expansion of the Petaluma campus, the Mahoney Library has expanded to five times its original size, . The new library building opened on June 16, 2008, the first day of summer session.

Technology Academy
There is a Technology Academy located on the Petaluma Campus. Opened in January 2009 in Telecom Valley, this unique educational program was established to meet the training needs of North Bay technology companies, offering classes and training programs to the general public and in-service training for the technology companies. Clientele includes incumbent workers, entry-level workers, and high school co-enrollment students.

Shone Farm
Established in 1972, the Robert Shone Farm currently operates as a self-sustaining  farm near the Russian River, in Forestville, generating income from the sale of grapes from the College's vineyard operation as well as oat hay, oat silage, and sheep and swine operations. A new Agriculture Pavilion was completed in 2006. The farm offers diversified, hands-on educational opportunities in Viticulture, Wine Studies, Equine Studies, Animal Science, Sustainable Agriculture, and Environmental Conservation. Produce raised in farm gardens are used in SRJC's Culinary Training Program and in a community supported agriculture program operated by students from agribusiness and sustainable agriculture programs. The Shone Farm Winery was established in fall 2008.

Public Safety Training Center
It also has a Public Safety Training Center in Windsor. The Public Safety Training Center was established in 1961, and currently provides coursework and field training for police officers, corrections officers, police dispatchers, seasonal park rangers, emergency medical technicians, paramedics, and firefighters. In spring 2002 the modern facility was completed on a  site in Windsor to provide in-service training for people working in public safety. The center is the largest provider of in-service training for law enforcement personnel north of the Golden Gate Bridge, offering traditional academic offerings, administration and classroom buildings, an emergency medical care laboratory facility, an indoor firing range, a large multipurpose building, a state-of-the-art scenario training village, and a driving instruction area with skid pad.

Athletics
Santa Rosa Junior College is home to the Bear Cubs. They are part of the Big 8 Athletic Conference and are usually contenders in most junior college playoff games. They are well known for their football, baseball, soccer and wrestling programs. They have a long time rivalry with the Sacramento City College Panthers. The Santa Rosa Junior College also has a very well known and successful Ice Hockey Program known as the Santa Rosa Junior College Polar Bears. Although the Ice Hockey team is a club sport the team has been nationally ranked in 2009-2010 and 2011-12. There are athletic organizations including Judo, Rugby, Cheerleading and Beach Volleyball.

Baseball
The baseball team won the state championship in 2016, placing second to Grossmont College in a seven-game championship series in 2017.

Speech and debate
SRJC Forensics, the speech & debate team, earned the #1 national ranking among two-year colleges in 2016. Led by Mark Nelson and Hal Sanford, the team ranked for five years (2012-2017) within the top six teams in the nation.

Notable alumni

Jacob Appelbaum, journalist, computer security researcher, hacker
Donna Boutelle, historian
Sheana Davis, chef and cheesemaker
Gary Friedman, co-CEO and chairman of Restoration Hardware
Adam Froman, American football player
Jonny Gomes, professional baseball player
Tyson Griffin, wrestler, Mixed Martial Artist
Gaye LeBaron, newspaper columnist, author, local historian
Michael Kearney, former child prodigy
Ben McKee, bassist for Imagine Dragons
Brandon Poulson, professional baseball player
Brande Roderick, model and actress
Gabbi Tuft, trans woman who was formerly a professional wrestler under the ring name Tyler Reks
Jason Verrett, National Football League cornerback

Notable faculty
Edward Von der Porten (1933-2018) early nautical archaeologist; expert on Sir Francis Drake's visit to New Albion in 1579; expert in early Chinese export porcelains; author on the German Navy in WW II, Francis Drake and Chinese porcelains.  Led efforts leading to the Drakes Bay National Historic and Archeological National Historic Landmark in 2012.

References

External links

 Official website

California Community Colleges
Educational institutions established in 1918
Universities and colleges in Sonoma County, California
Schools accredited by the Western Association of Schools and Colleges
Schools in Santa Rosa, California
Petaluma, California
1918 establishments in California